First Seed Ripening is the second studio album by Australian jazz band Elixir. The album is credited as featuring Katie Noonan. The album was released in August 2011 and peaked at number 64 on the ARIA Charts and number 1 on the Jazz and Blues chart, where it remained for 9 weeks.

Katie says of the album, "Our aim was to make gentle, intimate music, and it was all about freedom and spontaneity."
The album is described as "improvised folk and jazz-inspired blend of music".

The album is inspired by the words of Australian poet Thomas Shapcott.

At the ARIA Music Awards of 2011 it won the ARIA Award for Best Jazz Album.

Reviews
Border mail gave the album 3 1/2 out of 5 saying the album is "Intriguing".

The Mercury; "like a samurai sword through silk….this enchanting, honest, intimate album can’t fail".

The Australian; "Serenely ethereal".

Rave Magazine; "The album’s 14 songs have a seductive pull, helped along by a Nick Drake-level tranquility and, naturally, our heroine’s effortless vocal style".

Sunday Herald Sun; "filled with enchantment…Noonan’s voice, bare and beautiful against husband Zac Hurren’s intimate soprano sax and Stephen Magnusson’s expert jazz guitar, shines like a midnight star".

Track listing
 "First Seed Ripening" - 5:44
 "My Skin is a Glove" - 5:56
 "Stuff of Myths" - 3:51
 "Pierrot" - 5:33
 "Traditional Song" - 6:23
 "Last Flowers to the Hospital" (C Greenwood, E O'Brien, J Greenwood, P Selway, Radiohead, T Yorke) - 5:29
 "Circle of Moonlight" - 4:14
 "My Old Man" (Joni Mitchell) - 3:22
 "Sleep Soundly, Peacefully" - 5:13
 "Hemispheres" - 6:21
 "Nocturne" - 6:17
 "Last Night's Comfort" - 3:44
 "Snapshot" - 5:13
 "I Hope I Never" (Tim Finn) - 7:54

 Written-By – I Hurren (tracks: 1, 2, 4, 5, 7, 9 to 11, 13), K Noonan (tracks: 1 to 4, 5, 7, 9 to 13), N Stewart (tracks: 3), S Magnusson (tracks: 1, 2, 4, 5, 7, 10, 11, 13), T Shapcott (tracks: 1 to 4, 5, 7, 9 to 13)

Weekly charts

Credits
 Arranged By [Strings] – Stephen Newcomb
 Artwork, Design, Layout – Kidsincloaks.com
 Cello [The Elixir String Quartet] – Julian Thompson (tracks: 1, 2, 4, 10, 11, 13)
 Double Bass – Jonathan Zwartz (tracks: 1, 4, 7)
 Drums, Cymbal – Simon Barker (tracks: 1, 3, 7)
 Electric Guitar, Steel Guitar, Classical Guitar [Nylon String Guitar] – Stephen Magnusson
 Engineer, Mixed By – Lachlan Carrick
 Mastered By – Oscar Gaona
 Photography By – Will
 Soprano Saxophone, Tenor Saxophone – Zac Hurren
 Strings – The Elixir String Quartet (tracks: 1, 2, 4, 10, 11, 13)
 Viola [The Elixir String Quartet] – Stephen King (tracks: 1, 2, 4, 10, 11, 13)
 Violin [The Elixir String Quartet] – Aiko Goto (tracks: 1, 2, 4, 10, 11, 13), Helena Rathbone (tracks: 1, 2, 4, 10, 11, 13)

Release history

External links

References

2011 albums
ARIA Award-winning albums
Katie Noonan albums
Jazz albums by Australian artists
Elixir (Australian band) albums